Reise Malcolm Allassani (born 3 January 1996) is an English professional footballer who plays for Sevenoaks Town, he plays as a winger or occasionally as a striker.

Career 
At the age of 17, Allassani signed his first professional contract with Premier League side Crystal Palace, and played for the England U16 team.

In 2016, he joined National League side Bromley on a one-month loan deal.

Following a season with non-league side Dulwich Hamlet, he signed a two-year deal with Coventry City for an undisclosed fee.

Following his release from Coventry City, Allassani re-joined Dulwich Hamlet in September 2020. On 2 January 2022, Allassani returned to Dulwich Hamlet for a fourth spell with the club.

In July 2022, Allassani joined Carshalton Athletic. In October 2022, he joined Leatherhead before moving to Wingate & Finchley two months later. He joined Sevenoaks Town in March 2023.

Personal life
Born in England, Allassani is of Ghanaian descent.

Career statistics

References 

Living people
1996 births
Footballers from Greater London
Association football midfielders
English footballers
English sportspeople of Ghanaian descent
Crystal Palace F.C. players
Bromley F.C. players
Dulwich Hamlet F.C. players
Coventry City F.C. players
Ebbsfleet United F.C. players
Woking F.C. players
Carshalton Athletic F.C. players
Leatherhead F.C. players
Wingate & Finchley F.C. players
Sevenoaks Town F.C. players
English Football League players
National League (English football) players
Isthmian League players